Idrettslaget Sverre is a sports club located in Levanger, Norway. The club was founded on 26 September 1886, and today it has sections for football, gymnastics, tennis and cycling. The name originates from Birkebeiner king Sverre Sigurdsson.

Football

History
In the 1956–57 season, Sverre competed in play-offs to win promotion to the 1957–58 Hovedserien, the top division in the Norwegian football league system. Sverre lost 3–5 on aggregate against Molde and were never promoted to the top flight. Sverre kept on playing in lower leagues until their last season as a senior team in the fourth tier 3. divisjon in the 1995 season. In 1996, the men's senior football team merged with SK Nessegutten and created Levanger FK. They currently have football sections for youths up to the age of 16 years.

Former footballers
Former footballers of IL Sverre include:
Per Verner Rønning
Kristoffer Paulsen Vatshaug

Cycling
1972 Olympic track cycling champion Knud Knudsen represented IL Sverre.

References

External links
 Official site 

Sports teams in Norway
Football clubs in Norway
Association football clubs established in 1886
1886 establishments in Norway
Sport in Trøndelag
Levanger